Gangdong University is a private university located in Eumseong County, North Chungcheong Province, South Korea. The school has 59 professors and more than 4,000 students.

Timeline  
 11 June 1991: Founded Sunghui Academy Foundation
 5 March 1994: The school was founded as Chungbuk College
 1 March 1997: The school changed the name to Far East College
 7 June 2011: Changed the name to Gangdong University
 11 March 2014: Completed Art Museum

Campus 
The campus located near Chungju City.

Department 
The school has 26 department:

See also 
Education in South Korea
List of colleges and universities in South Korea

References

External links
 
 

Universities and colleges in North Chungcheong Province
Eumseong County
1994 establishments in South Korea
Educational institutions established in 1994